"Closer" is a song by American industrial rock band Nine Inch Nails, released as the second single on their second studio album, The Downward Spiral (1994). Released on May 30, 1994, it is considered one of Nine Inch Nails' signature songs and remains their most popular song. Most versions of the single are titled "Closer to God", a rare example in music of a single's title differing from the title of its A-side ("Closer to God" is also the title of an alternate version of "Closer" featured on the single, which was also released as a separate promotional single for club-play). The single is the ninth official Nine Inch Nails release, making it "Halo 9" in the band's official Halo numbering system.

A promotional single provided by the label to radio stations included both long and short vocal-censored (i.e. silenced profanity) versions. Although the song addresses themes such as self-hatred and obsession, its sexually aggressive chorus led to widespread misinterpretation of the song as an anthem of lust, which helped it become Nine Inch Nails' most successful single up to that time and cemented Trent Reznor's status as an industrial rock icon. Commercially, "Closer" reached  41 on the US Billboard Hot 100, No. 25 on the UK Singles Chart, and No. 3 on the Australian Singles Chart. Censored versions of the song and its Mark Romanek-directed music video received substantial airplay on radio and MTV.

Composition
"Closer" has been described as industrial rock and alternative rock. "Closer" uses elements of funk,  and electronic music. The drum track of "Closer" is built around a heavily modified sample of the bass drum from the 1977 Iggy Pop song "Nightclubbing", which was performed by a Roland drum machine. The samples were produced using two Akai S1100 samplers, each with an expander, essentially making up four samplers. The samples were then combined with beats produced by a Roland R-70 drum machine. The production features sound effects such as a bass squelch, synth echo, and feedback growl. Radio edits of "Closer" were created by muting the vocal track for the duration of each deleted obscenity.

Lyrically, "Closer" is a song about self-hatred and obsession; to Reznor's dismay, the song was widely misinterpreted as a lust anthem due to its chorus, which famously includes the lines "I wanna fuck you like an animal / I wanna feel you from the inside". In 2003, VH1 ranked the song at No. 93 in its countdown of the "100 Greatest Songs of the Past 25 Years." The song was ranked at No. 2 on AOL's "69 Sexiest Songs of All Time" due to the explicit frankness of the chorus. Mötley Crüe drummer Tommy Lee, said of the song, "Come on dude: 'I wanna fuck you like an animal'? That's the all-time fuck song. Those are pure fuck beats—Trent Reznor knew what he was doing. You can fuck to it, you can dance to it and you can break shit to it."

Although there were numerous remixes of "Closer", the version titled "Closer to God" was heavily reworked, as the vocals were completely re-recorded and the overall song retained only a few elements from the original version. "Closer to God" was also released as a promotional single separate from "Closer", mainly intended for club-play.

Reception
"Closer" had some radio airplay before it was released as a single. This factor increased within weeks, leading Interscope to release the song as a single in May 1994. When it premiered, the single charted on several US Billboard magazine music listings. Debuting near the bottom spot of the Billboard Hot 100, it barely missed the top 40, peaking at No. 41. It climbed to No. 11 on the Billboard Modern Rock Tracks chart, and also went on to reach No. 35 on the Billboard Album Rock Tracks chart and No. 29 on the Billboard Hot Dance Music/Maxi-Singles Sales chart. "Closer" was the band's first crossover hit and remains their most popular song to date.

The single was successful in several other countries as well. It charted the highest in Australia, where it rose to No. 3 on the week of November 13, 1994, and was the country's 87th most successful single of 1994. Although "Closer" did not initially appear on Canada's official music chart during its original release, it reached a peak of No. 5 on the Canadian Singles Chart in February 2002. It also did not chart in Denmark until 2007, when it reached No. 12 in July. In the United Kingdom, the single reached No. 25.

The aforementioned "Closer to God" version of the song charted at No. 29 on the Billboard Dance Music/Club Play Singles.

The song was voted in at No. 62 on Triple J's Hottest 100 of all time in 2009, and ranked No. 42 on Pitchfork Media's "Top 200 Tracks of the 90s" in 2010. In 2021, it was listed at No. 270 on Rolling Stone's "500 Greatest Songs of All Time". In 2020, Kerrang and Billboard ranked the song number five and number one, respectively, on their lists of the greatest Nine Inch Nails songs.

Music video
The music video was directed by Mark Romanek and first aired on May 12, 1994, having been filmed in April of that year. It was cut down from its original length to 4:36. Several sections of the video were shot inside the former Linda Vista Community Hospital in Los Angeles.  The video was popular and helped bolster the success of the band. Set in what appears to be a 19th-century mad scientist's laboratory, the video's imagery involves religion, sexuality, animal cruelty, politics, and terror, including:
 A heart connected to some sort of device; the beat of the heart corresponds to the beat of the song
 A little girl lounging on a chair 
 A nude, bald woman with a crucifix mask
 A monkey, scared, panicked, tied to a cross with a picture of Jack Nicholson on the right.
 A severed pig's head spinning on some type of machine.
 A diagram of the vulva/vagina
 Reznor wearing various fetish gear, such as an S&M mask, ball gag, and long leather gloves while swinging in shackles.
Several times, Reznor, wearing leather pants, floats and rotates through the air, suspended by invisible wires. There are also scenes of Reznor being blown back by a wind machine while wearing aviator goggles. Mark has stated: 

These images were inspired by the work of Joel-Peter Witkin, as well as by the Brothers Quay's animated short film Street of Crocodiles. For the television version, certain removed scenes were replaced with a title card that read "Scene Missing," and the instances of the word fuck being edited out were accompanied by a stop in the video motion, making it appear as if the stop was a result of defective film (this was supposedly done to make sure the flow of the song was not affected). According to Romanek, the video was filmed using "a slightly out of date film stock but it was still a contemporary film stock."

The unedited version of the video was shown on Playboy TV's music video show Hot Rocks in 1994. In mid-2002, the unedited version aired on MTV2 as part of a special countdown showcasing the most controversial videos ever to air on MTV. This countdown was only shown late at night due to the sexually explicit imagery of "Closer" and several other videos.

In 2006, "Closer" was voted No. 1 in a VH1 Classic poll, "20 Greatest Music Videos of All Time."

In retrospect, Reznor said of the video that "The rarest of things occurred: where the song sounded better to me, seeing it with the video. And it's my song."

The unedited video is included in Closure, The Downward Spiral (DualDisc), Directors Label Volume 4: The Work Of Director Mark Romanek and Vevo, and it is available for download from the United States iTunes Store under the band's page. Behind-the-scenes footage with commentary by Romanek is included in Closure (DVD) and Directors Label. It is also available on YouTube, and was previously flagged there before this restriction was lifted.

Live performances
During the Self Destruct and Fragility tours, bassist Danny Lohner and guitarist Robin Finck joined Reznor and full-time keyboardists James Woolley (during the first half of the Self Destruct Tour) and Charlie Clouser (during the remaining tours) on keyboards for the song, with Reznor performing an extended synth solo. Nine Inch Nails performed the "Closer to God" rendition of the song live during their 1995 tour on numerous occasions, omitting the original song from the setlist when done so.

There are performance videos of "Closer" on And All that Could Have Been and Beside You in Time.

In the tours following the release of With Teeth, Nine Inch Nails performed a shorter version of "Closer" with the keyboard solo played as a guitar solo and a breakdown incorporating a portion of "The Only Time," a track from Pretty Hate Machine. Two performances of this version of the song appear on Beside You in Time.

Formats and track listings
The version of "Closer" on the single is 13 seconds longer than the album version; on the album, the piano tune at the end of the song is abruptly cut off in order to segue into the next track, "Ruiner". On the single, the piano and background sounds of "Closer" are allowed to play out longer.

In addition, the U.S. CD single contains five guest remixes of "Closer", a remix of its fellow The Downward Spiral track "Heresy", an instrumental track "March of the Fuckheads" (unrelated to "March of the Pigs"), and a cover version of Soft Cell's song "Memorabilia", from their 1982 EP Non Stop Ecstatic Dancing. The UK single releases contain the same tracks split between two discs (each sold separately). A cassette single was issued in the U.S. and Australia, pairing "Closer" with the music video version of Nine Inch Nails' previous single, "March of the Pigs" (which was recorded live in the studio by the then-current lineup of the band).

The single's cover artwork was done by photographer Joseph Cultice.

US CD
 TVT Records / Interscope Records / Atlantic Records 95905–2
 TVT Records / Interscope Records 0694959052 (Reissue)

US cassette
 Nothing Records / TVT Records / Interscope Records / Atlantic Records 98263-4

UK CD
 Island Records CID 596 854 059–2 (Disc 1)
 Island Records CIDX 596 854 061–2 (Disc 2)

U.K. 12-inch vinyl – Part 1: Further Away
 Island Records 12IS 596 854 059–1 – UK 12-inch vinyl 1

UK 12-inch vinyl – Part 2: Closer to God
 Island Records 12ISX 596 854 061–1 – UK 12-inch vinyl 2

Other versions in other formats and countries have the same track listing as the U.S. CD release.

Personnel
 Trent Reznor – lead and backing vocals, guitar, bass guitar, keyboards, synthesizers, programming, sampling
 Chris Vrenna – drum samples
 Flood – special hi-hat programming

Charts

Weekly charts

Year-end charts

Certifications

Release history

Cover versions
 "Closer" has been covered by many musical acts, including MGMT, Blood on the Dance Floor, Richard Cheese and Lounge Against the Machine, Eric Gorfain, Maroon 5, Maxwell, The Asylum Street Spankers, Asking Alexandria, Rosetta Stone, In This Moment and Japanese Voyeurs.
 Thirty Seconds to Mars uses samples from "Closer" when they perform "The Fantasy".
 "Weird Al" Yankovic has paid tribute to "Closer" twice: in "The Alternative Polka" on his album Bad Hair Day, a section of the song was used in which the word "fuck" is replaced with a cartoon sound effect. "Germs" on his Running with Scissors album is a style parody of several Nine Inch Nails songs.
 The Asylum Street Spankers occasionally perform a bluegrass version, available at the  Live Music Archive.
 In 1995, the Australian novelty act Nine Inch Richards covered the song under the title "Closer To Hogs".  Sung in a southern drawl, it combined Trent Reznor's sexually charged lyrics with barnyard animal samples, humorously implying that the song is about bestiality.  A video clip of the parody was taken at the Sydney Royal Easter Show.  This single peaked at No. 51 in Australia.
 In 2008, Sy Smith performed the song as part of her "Conflict Tour". In August 2010, Smith performed the song again at "Baldwin Hills Crenshaw Heights Plaza".
 In 2014, from the compilation album in the Punk Goes 90's 2 has been covered by British rock Asking Alexandria.
 In 2016, singer-songwriter Father John Misty covered the song live in Chicago during two separate performances.
 Fellow Interscope act Limp Bizkit parodied "Closer" (as well "The Perfect Drug" and "Burn") in their song "Hot Dog". The chorus goes, "You wanna fuck me like an animal, You'd like to burn me on the inside, You like to think that I'm a perfect drug, Just know that nothing you do will bring you closer to me." Limp Bizkit frontman Fred Durst said he was a big fan of Nine Inch Nails, who has additionally inspired his music.

References

Bibliography

External links
 Halo 9 at NINCollector
 

Nine Inch Nails songs
1994 singles
1994 songs
Music video controversies
Interscope Records singles
Island Records singles
Nothing Records singles
Song recordings produced by Flood (producer)
Song recordings produced by Trent Reznor
Songs written by Trent Reznor
TVT Records singles